The Nero Decree was issued by Adolf Hitler on 19 March 1945, ordering the destruction of German infrastructure to prevent its use by Allied forces as they penetrated deep within Germany. It was officially titled Decree Concerning Demolitions in the Reich Territory and has subsequently become known as the Nero Decree, after the Roman Emperor Nero, who, according to an apocryphal story, engineered the Great Fire of Rome in 64 AD. The decree was deliberately disobeyed by Albert Speer.

Background 
By the beginning of 1945, the German situation was desperate. Most of the conquered territories had been liberated or recaptured, the Ardennes Offensive had failed, and Allied armies were advancing on Germany proper from both the East and the West. However, Hitler was not willing to accept the terms of unconditional surrender, and considered this as repeating the same shame as Versailles. Moreover, according to some around him, Hitler came to view the German people as having failed him, unworthy of their great mission in history and thus deserving to die alongside his regime.

This was not the first time Hitler had tried to destroy infrastructure before it could be taken. Shortly before the Liberation of Paris, Hitler ordered explosives to be placed around important landmarks, such as the Eiffel Tower, and key transportation hubs. If the Allies came near the city, the military governor, General Dietrich von Choltitz was to detonate these bombs, leaving Paris "lying in complete debris". Von Choltitz, however, did not carry out the order and surrendered to the Allies, later alleging that this was the moment he realized that "Hitler was insane". Similarly, Hitler had issued orders to enact a scorched earth policy upon the Netherlands in late 1944, when it became obvious that the Allies were about to retake the country, but Arthur Seyss-Inquart, the Reichskommissar in charge of the Netherlands during its occupation, was able to greatly limit the scope to which the order was executed.

The Decree 

Its most pertinent section reads as follows:

It is a mistake to think that transport and communication facilities, industrial establishments and supply depots, which have not been destroyed, or have only been temporarily put out of action, can be used again for our own ends when the lost territory has been recovered. The enemy will leave us nothing but scorched earth when he withdraws, without paying the slightest regard to the population. I therefore order:

1) All military transport and communication facilities, industrial establishments and supply depots, as well as anything else of value within Reich territory, which could in any way be used by the enemy immediately or within the foreseeable future for the prosecution of the war, will be destroyed.

Actions 

The decree was in vain. The responsibility for carrying it out fell to Albert Speer, Hitler's Minister of Armaments and War Production. According to him, Speer was appalled by the order and lost faith in the dictator. Just as von Choltitz had several months earlier, Speer deliberately failed to carry out the order. Upon receiving it, he requested to be given exclusive power to implement the plan, instead using his power to convince the generals and Gauleiters to ignore the order. Hitler remained unaware of this until the very end of the war, when Speer, while visiting Hitler on 22 April in his Berlin bunker for the last time, admitted to him that he deliberately disobeyed. Hitler was angry with his minister, but allowed Speer to leave nonetheless. Hitler committed suicide on 30 April 1945, forty-two days after issuing the order. Shortly afterwards, on 7 May 1945, General Alfred Jodl signed the German military surrender, and on 23 May Speer was arrested on the orders of U.S. General Dwight D. Eisenhower, together with the rest of the provisional German government led by Admiral Karl Dönitz, Hitler's successor as head of state.

See also 

 Albert Speer
 Gotthard Heinrici
 Hellmuth Reymann
 Is Paris Burning?
 Morgenthau Plan
 Destruction of Warsaw
 Railroad plough
 Scorched earth

Notes 

Nero
Orders by Adolf Hitler
1945 in Germany
Decrees
March 1945 events
1945 documents
Military plans